The Canadian Sweethearts, sometimes known as Bob & Lucille, were a Canadian singing duo, who were popular during the 1960s, disbanding in 1977. The duo consisted of vocalist Lucille Starr, and her guitar playing husband, Bob Regan. They are best known for the rockabilly song, "Eeny Meeny Miney Moe." Their contribution to the genre has been recognized by the Rockabilly Hall of Fame.

History
Regan was born Robert Frederickson, on March 13, 1931) in Rolla, British Columbia. As a child he played harmonica, guitar, mandolin and fiddle. Starr was born Lucille Marie Raymonde Savoie on May 13, 1938, in St. Boniface, Manitoba.  In 1958, Regan had been performing in his brother Keray's band The Peace Rangers and had recorded a single, ""Teenage Boogie/I Will Never Hold Another", singing a duet with his sister Fern on the B side. Starr had performed in the French band Les Hirondelles and later as a solo singer. The two met at a wedding and began performing together.  They soon married, and began to perform and record in Canada, calling themselves "Bob and Lucille". Their first recording was the 1958 single "Eeny-Meeny-Miney-Moe,", released through Ditto, a small recording studio in Hollywood, California.  A second single, "The Big Kiss/What's the Password", was also released through Ditto.

At this point the pair started billing themselves as "The Canadian Sweethearts", and in 1961 released a single, "No Help Wanted," with Soma. They performed and toured in the US and Canada. In 1963 the duo signed with A&M Records, and released two albums and a number of singles, including "Out For Fun/Freight Train". None were commercially successful in the US, although three were near the top of the Canadian charts. In 1964 Starr recorded "The French Song", singing solo and backed by the Tijuana Brass, label co-owner Herb Alpert's band. The single was a hit in Europe and was also popular in Canada (#12).

The Canadian Sweethearts appeared on various television programs, including regular appearances on ABC's Country America show, and toured with Hank Snow.

In 1966 they signed with Epic Records in Nashville, Tennessee, releasing a series of singles, some of which appeared briefly in the charts.  The next year the couple divorced, but continued to perform and record together until 1977.  The two went on to perform separately.

Regan died on March 5, 1990.
Starr died on September 4, 2020.

Discography

Albums

Singles

References

External links
Discography
 
 Entry at 45cat.com
 Article at thecanadianencyclopedia.ca

Canadian country music groups
Country music duos
Married couples
Musical groups established in 1958
Canadian musical duos
1958 establishments in British Columbia